Apopestes spectrum is a species of moth in the family Erebidae first described by Eugenius Johann Christoph Esper in 1787.

Description
Apopestes spectrum has a wingspan of 74–82 mm. The forewings of this large moth are light brown, with dark brown markings. In the postdiscal area near the inner edge there is a dark spot. The hindwings have a pale brown color. The caterpillars are slender and yellow, with two black stripes and irregular black markings on each side. The head shows whitish and black dots. The chrysalis is reddish brown.

There is one generation per year (univoltine). Caterpillars can be found from late April to June. They feed on Papilionaceae species, including Genista, Sarothamnus, Spaltium, Glycyrrhiza and Retama raetam. The moths overwinter from July up to March of the following year.

Distribution
This species has a Mediterranean distribution. It can be found in many European countries (Albania, Bosnia, Bulgaria, Croatia, France, Greece, Italy, Portugal, Slovenia, Spain, and Switzerland)  and from Maghreb, to western Turkey, Lebanon, Israel and Jordan.

Habitat
In the valleys of the southern Alps this moth lives in warm areas up to an elevation of about 800 meters.

References

Toxocampinae
Moths of Europe
Moths of Asia
Moths described in 1787
Taxa named by Eugenius Johann Christoph Esper